Maxse may refer to:

 Frederick Maxse (1833–1900), British Royal Navy officer and radical liberal
 Henry Berkeley Fitzhardinge Maxse (1832–1883), British soldier & Governor of Newfoundland
 Ivor Maxse (1862-1958), British soldier
 Leopold Maxse (1862-1934), British journalist & editor
 Marjorie Maxse (1891–1975), British political organiser